The MIT Department of Economics is a department of the Massachusetts Institute of Technology in Cambridge, Massachusetts.

Undergraduate studies in economics were introduced in the 19th century by institute president Francis Amasa Walker, while the department's Ph.D. program was introduced in 1941. The American Economics Association estimates that MIT and these peers produce half of all tenure track professors at U.S. research universities. By 2020, the department has the second highest number of Ph.D. alumni who received the Nobel Prize in Economics in the world (12) only behind Harvard Economics (13) and ahead of UChicago Economics (9). Nine out of 18 Clark medalists since 1999 received Ph.D. degrees from the department.

History
In the 1890s, economists including Francis Amasa Walker and Davis Rich Dewey taught courses in economics to the undergraduate students. It was known as the Department of Economics and Social Sciences. In 1937, the department established a graduate program, while in 1941, it established a Ph.D. program. In the 1950s and the 1960s, the department expanded its graduate program. In these years, the program became more quantitatively oriented and emphasized technical training. Approximately 25 students enrolled each year. In the 1970s, the first Black American graduate students joined the program as part of a desegregation program.

Prominent faculty
Paul Samuelson (1940–2009), Nobel Prize, 1970
Franco Modigliani (1962–2003), Nobel Prize, 1985
John Williamson (1967–1980), originator of the 'Washington Consensus'
Robert Solow, (1960-1979) Nobel Prize, 1987
Stanley Fischer, (1977–1988), Vice-Chairman of the US Federal Reserve, Governor of Bank of Israel
Robert F. Engle, (1969-1977), Nobel Prize, 2003
Daniel McFadden, (1977-1991), Nobel Prize 2000 
George P. Shultz, (1948-1957), Former Secretary of State, Secretary of Treasury, Secretary of Labour 
Myron S. Scholes (1968-1973), Nobel prize in 1997 for the Black-Scholes equation
Rudi Dornbusch (1975-2002), known for the Overshooting Model
Francesco Giavazzi (1989–Present)

Nobel Laureates
Among the department's past and current faculty and alumni are several recipients of the Nobel Prize in Economics:
 Joshua Angrist, 2021
 Esther Duflo (Ph.D., 1999) and Abhijit Banerjee, 2019
 William Nordhaus, 2018
 Bengt Holmstrom, 2016
 Jean Tirole, 2014
 Robert J. Shiller, 2013
 Peter A. Diamond, 2010
 Oliver E. Williamson, 2009
 Paul Krugman (Ph.D., 1977), 2008
 Eric Maskin, 2007
 Edmund Phelps, 2006
 Robert J. Aumann, 2005
 Robert F. Engle, 2003
 George Akerlof (Ph.D., 1966) and Joseph Stiglitz (Ph.D., 1967), 2001
 Daniel McFadden, 2000
 Robert Mundell (Ph.D., 1956), 1999
 Amartya Sen, 1998
 Robert C. Merton (Ph.D, 1970), 1997
 Robert Solow, 1987
 Franco Modigliani, 1985
 Lawrence Klein (Ph.D., 1944), 1980
 Paul Samuelson, 1970

Current Faculty

Professors
 Alberto Abadie
 Daron Acemoglu
 George-Marios Angeletos
 Joshua Angrist
 David Autor
 Abhijit Banerjee
 Ricardo J. Caballero 
 Victor Chernozhukov
 Arnaud Costinot
 Esther Duflo
 Glenn Ellison [past Department Head]
 Amy Finkelstein
 Drew Fudenberg
 Robert S. Gibbons
 Jonathan Gruber
 Jeffrey Harris
 Bengt R. Holmström [past Department Head]
 Whitney K. Newey
 Benjamin Olken
 Parag Pathak
 James M. Poterba [past Department Head]
 Drazen Prelec
 Nancy Rose [current Department Head]
 Robert M. Townsend
 John Van Reenen
 Iván Werning
 Michael Whinston
Alexander Wolitzky
 Muhamet Yildiz

Associate Professors

 Anna Mikusheva

Assistant Professors
 Nikhil Agarwal
 Isiah Andrews
 David Atkin
 Frank Schilbach

Senior Lecturer
 Sara Fisher Ellison

Professors Emeriti
 Morris Adelman
 Sidney Alexander
 Robert L. Bishop [former Department Head, former Dean School of Humanities, Arts, and Social Sciences]
 Olivier Blanchard
 Richard S. Eckaus [past Department Head]
 Peter A. Diamond [past Department Head]
 Stanley Fischer [past Department Head]
 Paul Joskow [past Department Head]
 Michael Piore
 Jerome Rothenberg
 Richard L. Schmalensee
 Abraham J. Seigel
 Robert Solow
 Peter Temin [past Department Head]
 William Wheaton

Affiliated Faculty
Mathias Dewatripont
Ernst Fehr
Jean Tirole

Former Faculty
 Susan Athey (Ph.D., Stanford) John Bates Clark Medal, 2007
 E. Cary Brown (Ph.D., Harvard) Professor of Economics, Emeritus
 Evsey Domar (Ph.D., Harvard)
 Rudi Dornbusch (Ph.D., Chicago) Ford International Professor, International Economics
 Robert F. Engle (Ph.D., Cornell)
 Stanley Fischer (Ph.D., MIT)
 Charles P. Kindleberger (Ph.D., Columbia) Ford International Professor of Economics, Emeritus
 Edwin Kuh (Ph.D., Harvard)
 Paul Krugman (Ph.D., MIT) John Bates Clark Medal, 1991
 Eric Maskin (Ph.D., Harvard)
 Daniel McFadden (Ph.D., Minnesota)
 Franco Modigliani (D.Jur., Rome and D.Soc.Sci., New School of Research) Institute Professor Emeritus; Professor of Finance & Economics
 George P. Shultz (Ph.D., MIT)
 Hal Varian (Ph.D., Berkeley)

Notable alumni
Lawrence R. Klein (Ph.D., 1944)  John Bates Clark Medalist, 1959; president of the Econometric Society, 1960; president of the American Economic Association, 1977; Laureate of the Sveriges Riksbank Prize in Economic Sciences in Memory of Alfred Nobel, 1980
Margaret Garritsen de Vries (Ph.D., 1946) Carolyn Shaw Bell Award Recipient, 2002 
George P. Shultz (Ph.D., 1949) Distinguished Fellow of the American Economic Association, 2004
Ronald W. Jones (Ph.D., 1956) Distinguished Fellow of the American Economic Association, 2009
William Nordhaus (Ph.D., 1967), Council of Economic Advisers 1977 - 1979
Mario Draghi (Ph.D., 1976) Governor of the Banca d'Italia, chairman of the Financial Stability Forum, president of the European Central Bank
Robert A. Mundell (Ph.D., 1956)  Distinguished Fellow of the American Economic Association, 1996; Laureate of the Sveriges Riksbank Prize in Economic Sciences in Memory of Alfred Nobel, 1999
Peter A. Diamond (Ph.D., 1963) president of the Econometric Society, 1991; president of the American Economic Association, 2003; Laureate of the Sveriges Riksbank Prize in Economic Sciences in Memory of Alfred Nobel, 2010
Riccardo Faini, (PhD), former head of the Economic and Financial Analysis Service of the Italian Ministry of Treasury
George A. Akerlof (Ph.D., 1966)  Laureate of the Sveriges Riksbank Prize in Economic Sciences in Memory of Alfred Nobel, 2001; president of the American Economic Association, 2006
Joseph E. Stiglitz (Ph.D., 1966)  John Bates Clark Medalist, 1979; Laureate of the Sveriges Riksbank Prize in Economic Sciences in Memory of Alfred Nobel, 2001
Jagdish N. Bhagwati (Ph.D., 1967) Distinguished Fellow of the American Economic Association, 2003
Robert E. Hall (Ph.D., 1967) president of the American Economic Association, 2010
William D. Nordhaus (Ph.D., 1967)  Member of the Council of Economic Advisers, 1977–1979; Distinguished Fellow of the American Economic Association, 2004; president of the American Economic Association, 2014; Laureate of the Sveriges Riksbank Prize in Economic Sciences in Memory of Alfred Nobel, 2018
Avinash K. Dixit (Ph.D., 1968) president of the Econometric Society, 2001; president of the American Economic Association, 2008
Robert J. Gordon (Ph.D., 1967) Distinguished Fellow of the American Economic Association, 2014
Michael Rothschild, (Ph.D., 1968) Distinguished Fellow of the American Economic Association, 2005
Stanley Fischer (Ph.D., 1969) Vice-Chairman of the US Federal Reserve, Governor of the Bank of Israel; Distinguished Fellow of the American Economic Association, 2013
Robert C. Merton (Ph.D., 1970)  president of the American Finance Association, 1986; Laureate of the Sveriges Riksbank Prize in Economic Sciences in Memory of Alfred Nobel, 1997
Tommaso Padoa-Schioppa, (M.Sc. 1970), European Central Bank executive board 1998-2005, former Italian minister of economy and finance
Jeremy J. Siegel (Ph.D., 1971) financial markets guru
Martin Neil Baily (Ph.D., 1972) Chairman of the Council of Economic Advisers, 1999–2001
Alan S. Blinder (Ph.D., 1971) Distinguished Fellow of the American Economic Association, 2011
Robert J. Shiller (Ph.D., 1972) Fellow of the American Finance Association, 2006; Laureate of the Sveriges Riksbank Prize in Economic Sciences in Memory of Alfred Nobel, 2013
Lawrence Summers (B.S., 1975) Secretary of the Treasury, 1999–2001
Mario Draghi (Ph.D., 1976) president of the European Central Bank 2011-, Governor of the Banca d'Italia, Chairman of the Financial Stability Forum
Paul R. Krugman (Ph.D., 1977) Member of the Council of Economic Advisers, 1982–1983; John Bates Clark Medalist, 1991; Laureate of the Sveriges Riksbank Prize in Economic Sciences in Memory of Alfred Nobel, 2008
Lucas Papademos (Ph.D., 1977)  vice president of the European Central Bank, 2002-
Ben S. Bernanke (Ph.D., 1979)  Chairman of the Federal Reserve, 2006-2014
Kenneth S. Rogoff (Ph.D., 1980)  IMF chief economist
Jean Tirole (Ph.D., 1981) president of the Econometric Society, 1998; president of the European Economic Association, 2001; Laureate of the Sveriges Riksbank Prize in Economic Sciences in Memory of Alfred Nobel, 2014
N. Gregory Mankiw (Ph.D., 1984)  Chairman of the Council of Economic Advisers, 2003–2005
Andrei Shleifer (Ph.D., 1986) John Bates Clark Medalist, 1999
Matthew Rabin (Ph.D., 1989) John Bates Clark Medalist, 2001
Andrew Samwick (Ph.D., 1993)  Member of the Council of Economic Advisers, 2003–2004
Judith Chevalier (Ph.D., 1993)  Elaine Bennett Research Prize recipient, 1998
Steven D. Levitt (Ph.D., 1994)  John Bates Clark Medalist, 2003; co-author of Freakonomics
Emmanuel Saez (Ph.D., 1999) John Bates Clark Medalist, 2009
Esther Duflo (Ph.D. 1999), John Bates Clark Medalist, 2010; Elaine Bennett Research Prize recipient, 2002; Laureate of the Sveriges Riksbank Prize in Economic Sciences in Memory of Alfred Nobel, 2019; co-author Poor Economics
Jonathan Levin (Ph.D., 1999) John Bates Clark Medalist, 2011
Amy Finkelstein (Ph.D., 2001) John Bates Clark Medalist, 2012; Elaine Bennett Research Prize recipient, 2008

References

External links
MIT Department of Economics website

Massachusetts Institute of Technology
Economics schools